"Walk this way" is a recurrent pun in a number of comedy films and television shows. It may be derived from an old vaudeville joke that refers to the double usage of the word "way" in English as both a direction and a manner.

One version of this old joke goes like this: A heavy-set woman goes into a drug store and asks for talcum powder. The bowlegged clerk says, "Walk this way," and the woman answers, "If I could walk that way I wouldn't need talcum powder!"

As a popular visual gag, the joke has appeared in films, perhaps first in "Is My Palm Read" (1933), a Fleischer cartoon short in which Betty Boop complies with the instruction of Bimbo playing the palm reader. It is used in  After the Thin Man (1936), with William Powell imitating the butler, and by director Mel Brooks, including The Producers, Young Frankenstein and Robin Hood: Men in Tights. According to Gene Wilder, who co-wrote the script of Young Frankenstein and played the title character, Brooks added the joke while shooting the scene, inspired by the old "talcum powder" routine. Marty Feldman, who played the hunchback Igor in Young Frankenstein, later said: 

The Aerosmith song Walk This Way was inspired after the band went to see Young Frankenstein in 1974.

References

Further reading
 

Quotations from film
English phrases
Puns
Mel Brooks
1930s neologisms
Comedy catchphrases